Midtre Tverråtinden is a mountain in Lom Municipality in Innlandet county, Norway. The mountain is surrounded by several other notable mountains including Svellnosbreahesten to the north; Store Tverråtinden to the west, Bukkehøe and Lindbergtinden to the southwest, Bukkeholstindene to the southwest, and Store Styggehøe and Bukkeholshøe to the southeast.

See also
List of mountains of Norway by height

References

Jotunheimen
Lom, Norway
Mountains of Innlandet